The Iowa Heartlanders are a professional minor league ice hockey team in the ECHL based in Coralville, Iowa. The team began play in the 2021–22 ECHL season, playing their home games at Xtream Arena.

History
On September 17, 2020, Newfoundland Growlers' majority owner Dean MacDonald (through his group Deacon Sports and Entertainment) came to an agreement with the city of Coralville to place an ECHL team in Xtream Arena, pending league approval, for the 2021–22 season. On January 12, 2021, the team was approved by the ECHL Board of Governors to join the league for the 2021–22 season. In March 2021, the team announced it had hired former ECHL commissioner Brian McKenna as team president. The team name, Iowa Heartlanders, was announced on May 20, 2021. On June 17, the Heartlanders announced they would be the affiliate of the Minnesota Wild. On July 27, 2021, the Heartlanders named Gerry Fleming as their inaugural head coach.

On October 22, 2021, the Heartlanders played their first game against the Kansas City Mavericks and won 7–4 at home with more than 4000 in attendance. In November, Kris Bennett was named the team's first captain, with Jake Linhart and Riese Zmolek given alternate captain roles.

The Heartlanders finished their inaugural season with 29 wins, which included a franchise-best seven-game winning streak from mid-February - early March 2022.

In the summer of 2022, former Head Coach Gerry Fleming accepted an opportunity in the DEL (top German pro league) with a club in Frankfurt, Germany. The move paved the way for Fleming's assistant coach Derek Damon to take over the Head Coaching position. Damon was officially announced as the second coach in team history on July 5, 2022.

The Heartlanders set the team's all-time attendance record on Opening Night 2022 (Oct. 21, 2022) vs. the Idaho Steelheads.

Season-by-season records

Players

Current roster
Updated November 13, 2022

References

External links
 

ECHL teams
Ice hockey clubs established in 2021
Ice hockey teams in Iowa
Coralville, Iowa
2021 establishments in Iowa
Minnesota Wild minor league affiliates